Crawlers are a British rock band from Liverpool, formed in 2018.

Their song "Come Over (Again)" went viral on TikTok in late 2021. Ever since then, the band has been very successful, touring around the world and creating a growing fanbase.

In 2022 they signed to Polydor Records, and have released an EP Loud Without Noise under the record label which debuted in the UK album charts in November 2022.

History 
Crawlers was formed in 2018 by schoolmates Amy Woodall and Liv Kettle, and Holly Minto, who Kettle had met at the Liverpool Institute for Performing Arts. Drummer Harry Breen later joined and they began performing at small venues in Liverpool. The band gained an internet following, especially on TikTok. Their song "Come Over Again" charted in the top 100 on the UK Singles Chart. This led to the band being signed by Polydor Records in January 2022. The band played two sold-out UK tours in April and November 2022, during which they played their largest show to date at the O2 Academy Liverpool. In the same year the band performed at multiple UK festivals and opened for My Chemical Romance in May 2022 in Warrington. On 17 January 2023, their song "So Tired" was featured on DC Doom Patrol.

Discography

EPs

Crawlers - EP (2021)
Crawlers released their debut self-titled EP on October 21, 2021. The EP was a compilation of four of their previous singles, including 'Come Over (Again)', which gained significant popularity on TikTok that same year.

Loud Without Noise (2022) 
Crawlers released their second EP Loud Without Noise on 4 November 2022. The EP debuted at 22 on the UK album charts and 1st on the UK rock and metal album charts, selling 3,300 units. This was the band's first-ever top 40.

Singles 
 "So Tired" (2019)
 "Placebo" (2020)
 "Hush" (2020)

Members 
 Harry Breen - drums 
 Liv Kettle - bass guitar
 Holly Minto - vocals, lyrics, guitar and trumpet. Minto also runs and manages the band’s social media accounts.  
 Amy Woodall - guitar

References 

English rock music groups
Musical groups from Liverpool
Musical groups established in 2018
2018 establishments in England
Female-fronted musical groups